is a Japanese politician of the Democratic Party of Japan, a member of the House of Representatives in the Diet (national legislature). Kondō, the son of former Minister of Labor Tetsuo Kondo, was born in Washington, D.C. but grew up in Yamagata Prefecture. A graduate Keio University, he joined the national newspaper Nihon Keizai Shimbun in 1988, which he left in 1999. He was elected for the first time in 2003 after an unsuccessful run in 2000.

References

External links 
  in Japanese.

|-

 

1965 births
Living people
People from Washington, D.C.
People from Yamagata Prefecture
Keio University alumni
Members of the House of Representatives (Japan)
Democratic Party of Japan politicians
21st-century Japanese politicians